John Germain may refer to:

Sir John Germain, 1st Baronet
John Germain (bishop)

See also
Germain (surname)